The 1941 Ball State Cardinals football team was an American football team that represented  Ball State University as a member of the Indiana Intercollegiate Conference (IIC) during the 1941 college football season. In its seventh season under head coach John Magnabosco, the team compiled a 3–2–2 record (3–1–1 against IIC opponents). The team played its home games at Cardinal Field in Muncie, Indiana.

Two Ball State players were selected by The Indianapolis News to its All-Indiana college football teams: guard Paul Miller (1st team); and end Ralph Bibler (2nd team).

Schedule

References

Ball State
Ball State Cardinals football seasons
Ball State Cardinals football